TPC Boston is a private golf club in the northeastern United States, located in Norton, Massachusetts, approximately  south of Boston.

History
Originally designed by Arnold Palmer and built in 2002, the course was re-designed in 2007 by Gil Hanse and PGA Tour player Brad Faxon. The course is a member of the Tournament Players Club network operated by the PGA Tour. Prior to 2019, the course was the venue for the Dell Technologies Championship, which was previously known as the Deutsche Bank Championship  In 2019, with significant changes to the PGA Tour's schedule change and playoff format, the Dell Technologies Championship was eliminated from the PGA Tour schedule in an effort to end the FedEx Cup playoffs prior to the start of football season. As part of the new schedule, TPC Boston became part of a rotating venue for The Northern Trust, alternating years with a venue in the New York City area. The tournament is held at TPC Boston in even-numbered years starting in 2020.

Scorecard

References

External links

Dell Technologies Championship - course information

Golf clubs and courses in Massachusetts
Buildings and structures in Bristol County, Massachusetts
Norton, Massachusetts
Sports in Bristol County, Massachusetts